Manolis Fazos (born 12 August 1995) is a Greek professional footballer who plays as a centre-back for Super League 2 club Proodeftiki.

Honours
OFI
Gamma Ethniki: 2015–16
Football League: 2017–18
Ionikos
Super League Greece 2: 2020–21

References

1995 births
Living people
Greek footballers
Greece youth international footballers
Super League Greece players
Football League (Greece) players
OFI Crete F.C. players
Olympiacos Volos F.C. players
Association football defenders